South Tyneside Youth Orchestra (STYO), now known as 'South Tyneside Orchestra' is an orchestra based in South Tyneside in the North East of England. It consists of over 40 amateur musicians, many ex pupils of the South Tyneside Music Service.

The orchestra, and other ensembles from South Tyneside Music Service, were the first LEA Music Service to showcase talent at the then new Sage Gateshead. They have also performed at other notable venues in the North East such as Newcastle City Hall, The Sunderland Empire Theatre and The Customs House, South Shields.

Metropolitan Borough of South Tyneside
English youth orchestras
Music in Tyne and Wear